Alexa Curtis (born 4 January  2004) is an Australian singer, songwriter and actress. She won The Voice Kids Australia as part of Team Delta in 2014, and subsequently signed with Universal Music Australia. Curtis represented Australia in the Junior Eurovision Song Contest 2016, where she placed fifth with 202 points.

Early life
Curtis was born on 4 January 2004 to her New Zealand parents. She has an older brother, Aidan. Two years before she was born, her family originally lived in Auckland, New Zealand, before relocating to Australia in 2002. She won The Voice Kids Australia in 2014 and was signed with Universal Music Australia.

Career

Acting
In 2021, Alexa gained the lead role as Taylor Young in Rock Island Mysteries, a 20-part adventure/drama series which was shot on the Gold Coast, Queensland. A joint collaboration between Fremantle Australia and Nickelodeon. It premiered on May 2, 2022, on 10 Shake and 10 Play. It will air on Nickelodeon Australia and New Zealand from June 2022 and global audiences on Nickelodeon International later in the year.
In 2019 Alexa played a supporting role as Jordan in the locally-shot movie Swimming for Gold.

Singing
In 2014 Alexa was a contestant on The Voice Kids. While all chairs turned, she chose Team Delta. She made it to the grand final where she won.
Alexa appeared twice in the 2014 Schools Spectacular, first performing with her Voice Kids co-stars, then duetting with The Voice winner Anja Nissen. The same year she performed with a small group of The Voice Kids at Vision Australia's Carols by Candlelight. In 2015 and 2016 she performed as a featured artist at the Brisbane IGA Lord Mayor's Christmas Carols. In 2016 she sang the opening theme song for six episodes of The Powerpuff Girls on Cartoon Network Australia.

Alexa represented Australia in the 2016 Junior Eurovision Song Contest. The song she sang was called "We Are". She finished in fifth place with 202 points.
In 2020 Alexa released her first single 'Overflow' with music and lyrics 100% owned by her. It was independently released.

Discography

Singles

Guest appearances

References

External links 

2004 births
Living people
Australian child singers
Australian people of New Zealand descent
Junior Eurovision Song Contest entrants
21st-century Australian singers